Harry Sibley Hinchman (August 4, 1878 – January 19, 1933) was a Major League Baseball second baseman who played for one season. He played in 15 games for the Cleveland Naps during the 1907 Cleveland Naps season.

In contrast to his one season in the major leagues, Hinchman played for 18 seasons in the minor leagues.  He began his professional career with the Ilion Typewriters of the New York State League in 1902.  His best year as a player in 1915 with the Kansas City Blues of the American Association.  That year he had a .326 batting average.  His last year as a player was in 1921 with the Chambersburg Maroons of the class D Blue Ridge League.

In addition to being a player, he also managed several minor league teams from 1910 to 1932 (to 1921 as a player/manager and from 1923 solely as manager).

External links

1878 births
1933 deaths
 Major League Baseball second basemen
 Cleveland Naps players
 Ilion Typewriters players
 Wilkes-Barre Barons (baseball) players
 Binghamton Bingoes players
 Toledo Mud Hens managers
 Toledo Mud Hens players
 St. Paul Saints (AA) players
 St. Paul Apostles players
 Kansas City Blues (baseball) players
 Lincoln Tigers players
 Sioux City Indians players
 Lawrence Barristers players
 Waterbury Nattatucks players
 Chambersburg Maroons players
 Baseball players from Pennsylvania